The Itata Province is one of the three provinces of the Ñuble Region;, its capital is Quirihue.

Communes 
Quirihue (11.429)
Cobquecura (1.493)
Ninhue (5.738)
Treguaco (5.296)
Portezuelo (4.953)
Coelemu (16.082)
Ránquil  (5.683)

References 

Provinces of Chile
Provinces of Ñuble Region
Itata
2018 establishments in Chile
2018 in Chilean law